Please don't delete this article because this actor is playing a lead or supporting role in the tokusatsu series "Kamen Rider Ex-Aid" and will continue his career and make more roles, either lead or supporting, after the end of the programme.

 is a Japanese actor. He is represented with Amuse, Inc.

Biography
Kai debuted in 2015. He was scouted by the talent agency Amuse during high school. However, at the request of his principal, Kai finished high school before entering the entertainment business.

In 2016, Kai made his first television appearance in Kamen Rider Ex-Aid as Parado / Kamen Rider Para-DX.

Filmography

TV drama

Films

References

External links

Male actors from Tokyo
1997 births
Living people
Amuse Inc. talents

21st-century Japanese singers
21st-century Japanese male singers